Anja Haas (born 30 May 1971 in Gerlos) is a retired Austrian alpine skier. She competed in two events at the 1994 Winter Olympics.

World Cup victories

References

1971 births
Austrian female alpine skiers
Living people
Sportspeople from Tyrol (state)
Olympic alpine skiers of Austria
Alpine skiers at the 1994 Winter Olympics
20th-century Austrian women
21st-century Austrian women